South Shields Interchange is the  Tyne and Wear Passenger Transport Executive ran transport hub which serves the coastal town of South Shields, South Tyneside in Tyne and Wear, England.

History

The station, which was originally located on Mile End Road, was opened on 2 June 1879 by the North Eastern Railway. It later became a part of the Tyneside Electrics. It closed for conversion in June 1981, ahead of opening as part of the Tyne and Wear Metro network.

The original Grade II listed station building, located near to Mile End Road, remained following conversion, but was demolished in the late 1990s after falling into disrepair. 

It joined the network as a terminus station on 24 March 1984, following the opening of the fifth phase of the network, between Heworth and South Shields. 

On 4 August 2019, the station re-opened, as part of the new South Shields Interchange.

Maintenance and Renewals Skills Centre
In July 2018, Tyne and Wear Passenger Transport Executive announced an £8.4million project to construct a Maintenance and Renewals Skills Centre. The three-storey building, which houses a training hub, as well as stabling facilities for up to two trains, opened in September 2020.

Facilities 
Step-free access is available at all stations across the Tyne and Wear Metro network, with two lifts providing step-free access to platforms at South Shields. The station is equipped with ticket machines, sheltered waiting area, seating, next train information displays, timetable posters, and an emergency help point. Ticket machines are able to accept payment with credit and debit card (including contactless payment), notes and coins. The station is fitted with automatic ticket barriers, which were installed at 13 stations across the network during the early 2010s, as well as smartcard validators, which feature at all stations. The station houses a Greggs outlet as well as a now disused Nexus TravelShop, both of which are located within the bus concourse.

The large bus interchange is located on the lower level, providing frequent connections throughout the local Tyne and Wear area as well as a half-hourly service reaching Durham. The bus station has 14 departure stands (lettered A–P), with an additional stand used by long-distance coach services. Each stand is fitted with seating, next bus information displays, and timetable posters. There is also a taxi rank located just outside the main Keppel Street entrance and secure cycle lockers at the south entrance.

Tyne and Wear Metro services 
, the station is served by up to five trains per hour on weekdays and Saturday, and up to four trains per hour during the evening and on Sunday.

Rolling stock used: Class 599 Metrocar

Bus Services 

It is served by: Go North East services 5, 24, 26, 27 and 50, South Shields based Stagecoach North East services 1-2, 3-4, 7-8, 10, 11, 12, 17, 18, X20,30 and 516.These routes mostly serve South Tyneside, Sunderland, Gateshead, Newcastle upon Tyne and County Durham.

References

External links
 
 Timetable and station information for South Shields

Buildings and structures in the Metropolitan Borough of South Tyneside
Transport in South Shields
1984 establishments in England
Railway stations in Great Britain opened in 1984
2019 establishments in England
Railway stations in Great Britain opened in 2019
Tyne and Wear Metro Yellow line stations
Transport in Tyne and Wear
Bus stations in Tyne and Wear